Crème fraîche is a soured cream.  It may also refer to:

 Creme Fraiche (horse), an American Thoroughbred racehorse
 "Crème Fraîche" (South Park), the 14th episode and season finale of the fourteenth season of American animated television series South Park